Fuding railway station is a railway station located in Fuding City, Ningde, Fujian Province, China, on the Wenzhou-Fuzhou Railway operated by the Nanchang Railway Bureau, China Railway Corporation.

References 

Railway stations in Fujian
Railway stations in China opened in 2009